Acmanthina molinana is a species of moth of the  family Tortricidae. It is found in Maule Region, Chile.

The wingspan is about 19 mm. The ground colour of the forewings is whitish, in some parts mixed with cream, in the postmedian and terminal areas suffused with grey. The markings are grey with black dots and strigulae (fine streaks). The hindwings are white grey, although the periphery and strigulation is brownish grey.

Etymology
The species name refers to the type locality, Molina.

References

Moths described in 2010
Euliini
Moths of South America
Taxa named by Józef Razowski
Endemic fauna of Chile